The 1990 LPGA Tour was the 41st season since the LPGA Tour officially began in 1950. The season ran from January 19 to November 4. The season consisted of 34 official money events. Beth Daniel won the most tournaments, seven. She also led the money list with earnings of $863,578.

The Mazda LPGA Championship was the first tournament to offer a $1,000,000 purse and the first to have a winner's share of over $100,000. There were seven first-time winners in 1990: Jane Crafter, Cathy Gerring, Cathy Johnston, Kris Monaghan, Barb Mucha, Tina Purtzer, and Maggie Will.

The tournament results and award winners are listed below.

Tournament results
The following table shows all the official money events for the 1990 season. "Date" is the ending date of the tournament. The numbers in parentheses after the winners' names are the number of wins they had on the tour up to and including that event. Majors are shown in bold.

^ - weather-shortened tournament

Awards

References

External links
LPGA Tour official site
1990 season coverage at golfobserver.com

LPGA Tour seasons
LPGA Tour